Neelagandeeswarar Temple is a Hindu temple located at Neelankarai, a southern neighbourhood of Chennai, India. The temple is dedicated to Neelagandeeswara (Shiva).

See also
 Religion in Chennai

Hindu temples in Chennai